The 2004–05 Argentine Torneo Argentino A was the tenth season of third division professional football in Argentina. A total of 20 teams competed; the champion was promoted to Primera B Nacional.

Club information

Zone A

Zone B

Zone C

Zone D

Apertura 2004

First stage
In every round the bye team played against the bye team of the other zone: Team from Zone A vs Team from Zone B and Team from Zone C vs Team from Zone D.

Zone A

Zone B

Zone C

Zone D

Second stage

Final stage

Note: The team in the first line plays at home the second leg.

Revalida Stage

Clausura 2005

First stage
In every round the bye team played against the bye team of the other zone: Team from Zone A vs Team from Zone B and Team from Zone C vs Team from Zone D.

Zone A

Zone B

Zone C

Zone D

Second stage

Final stage

Note: The team in the first line plays at home the second leg.

Revalida Stage

Overall standings

Zone A

Zone B

Zone C

Zone D

Championship final

Aldosivi played the Promotion Playoff Qualifying against the Revalida Final winner.

Revalida Final

Lujan de Cuyo played the Promotion Playoff Qualifying against the Championship Final loser.

Promotion playoff qualifying

 

Aldosivi played the Promotion/relegation playoff B Nacional-Torneo Argentino A.

Promotion/relegation playoff B Nacional-Torneo Argentino A

 

Aldosivi was promoted to 2005–06 Primera B Nacional by winning the playoff and |Racing (C) was relegated to 2005–06 Torneo Argentino A.

Relegation playoff Qualifying

Rosario Puerto Belgrano was relegated to Torneo Argentino B and Independiente Rivadavia played the Relegation Playoff.

Gimnasia y Tiro was relegated to Torneo Argentino B and Gimnasia y Esgrima (CdU) played the Relegation Playoff.

Relegation playoff

|-
!colspan="5"|Relegation/promotion playoff 1

|-
!colspan="5"|Relegation/promotion playoff 2

1: First leg awarded 0-1; originally 3-0 but Real Arroyo Seco used ineligible players.

Gimnasia y Esgrima (CdU) remained in the Torneo Argentino A by winning the playoff.
Independiente Rivadavia remained in the Torneo Argentino A by winning the playoff.

See also
2004–05 in Argentine football

References

Torneo Argentino A seasons
3